Khouw Tjeng Tjoan, -titulair der Chinezen (born 1808 — died in 1880) was a Chinese-Indonesian magnate and landlord.

He was born in 1808 into the Khouw family of Tamboen, part of the 'Cabang Atas' or Chinese gentry of colonial Indonesia. Khouw was the oldest of the three sons of the landlord  (died in 1843). Prior to his Chinese lieutenancy, he had the hereditary title of Sia as the son of a Chinese officer. He was raised in 1856, together with his brother Khouw Tjeng Kee, to the honorary rank of Luitenant-titulair der Chinezen, but without any of the entailed responsibilities in the civil administration.

 Khouw Tjeng Tjoan lived with his wife, ten concubines and twenty-four children at Candra Naya, one of the three mansions on Molenvliet belonging to the Khouw family of Tamboen. His funeral in 1880 attracted - according to contemporary newspapers - thousands of onlookers who thronged the whole stretch of Molenvliet, all the way to Kebon Jeruk. Nonetheless, at least one writer commented that the late magnate was, in fact, unpopular among the general populace due to his "conceit, wrathfulness and twisted character".

Six of the 's sons later served as Chinese officers in the colonial bureaucracy, most notably Khouw Kim An, the fifth and last Majoor der Chinezen of Batavia.

References

1808 births
1880 deaths
People from Batavia, Dutch East Indies
Businesspeople of the Dutch East Indies
Indonesian people of Chinese descent
Indonesian Hokkien people
Kapitan Cina
Khouw family of Tamboen
Sia (title)
Indonesian landlords
19th-century landowners
19th-century businesspeople